Cramoisy is a railway station located in the commune of Cramoisy in the Oise department, France.  The station is served by TER Hauts-de-France trains (Beauvais - Creil line, line P32).

See also
List of SNCF stations in Hauts-de-France

References

Railway stations in Oise